Dale Garfieldson Africa (born 14 September 1981) is a West Indian cricketer. Africa is a right-handed batsman who bowls right-arm slow-medium.

In February 2006, the United States Virgin Islands were invited to take part in the 2006 Stanford 20/20, whose matches held official Twenty20 status. Africa made two appearances in the tournament, in a preliminary round victory against St Maarten and in a first-round defeat against St Vincent and the Grenadines. Against St Maarten he scored 15 runs from 10 balls, before being dismissed by John Eugene. Against St Vincent and the Grenadines he was dismissed for a 2 runs by Kenroy Martin.

References

External links
Dale Africa at ESPNcricinfo
Dale Africa at CricketArchive

1981 births
Living people
United States Virgin Islands cricketers